Events in the year 1984 in Japan.

Incumbents
Emperor: Hirohito (Emperor Shōwa)
Prime Minister: Yasuhiro Nakasone (L–Gunma, 2nd term)
 Chief Cabinet Secretary: Takao Fujinami (L–Mie)
 Chief Justice of the Supreme Court: Jirō Terata
 President of the House of Representatives: Kenji Fukunaga (L–Saitama)
 President of the House of Councillors: Mutsuo Kimura (L–Okayama)
 Diet sessions: 101st (special session opened in December 1983, to August 8), 102nd (regular, December 1 through 1985, June 25)

Governors
Aichi Prefecture: Reiji Suzuki 
Akita Prefecture: Kikuji Sasaki 
Aomori Prefecture: Masaya Kitamura 
Chiba Prefecture: Takeshi Numata 
Ehime Prefecture: Haruki Shiraishi 
Fukui Prefecture: Heidayū Nakagawa 
Fukuoka Prefecture: Hachiji Okuda 
Fukushima Prefecture: Isao Matsudaira 
Gifu Prefecture: Yosuke Uematsu 
Gunma Prefecture: Ichiro Shimizu 
Hiroshima Prefecture: Toranosuke Takeshita 
Hokkaido: Takahiro Yokomichi 
Hyogo Prefecture: Tokitada Sakai
Ibaraki Prefecture: Fujio Takeuchi 
Ishikawa Prefecture: Yōichi Nakanishi 
Iwate Prefecture:   
Kagawa Prefecture: Tadao Maekawa 
Kagoshima Prefecture: Kaname Kamada 
Kanagawa Prefecture: Kazuji Nagasu 
Kochi Prefecture: Chikara Nakauchi  
Kumamoto Prefecture: Morihiro Hosokawa 
Kyoto Prefecture: Yukio Hayashida 
Mie Prefecture: Ryōzō Tagawa 
Miyagi Prefecture: Sōichirō Yamamoto 
Miyazaki Prefecture: Suketaka Matsukata 
Nagano Prefecture: Gorō Yoshimura 
Nagasaki Prefecture: Isamu Takada 
Nara Prefecture: Shigekiyo Ueda 
Niigata Prefecture: Takeo Kimi 
Oita Prefecture: Morihiko Hiramatsu 
Okayama Prefecture: Shiro Nagano 
Okinawa Prefecture: Junji Nishime 
Osaka Prefecture: Sakae Kishi
Saga Prefecture: Kumao Katsuki 
Saitama Prefecture: Yawara Hata 
Shiga Prefecture: Masayoshi Takemura 
Shiname Prefecture: Seiji Tsunematsu 
Shizuoka Prefecture: Keizaburō Yamamoto 
Tochigi Prefecture: Yuzuru Funada (until 8 December); Fumio Watanabe (starting 9 December)
Tokushima Prefecture: Shinzo Miki 
Tokyo: Shun'ichi Suzuki 
Tottori Prefecture: Yuji Nishio 
Toyama Prefecture: Yutaka Nakaoki
Wakayama Prefecture: Shirō Kariya  
Yamagata Prefecture: Seiichirō Itagaki 
Yamaguchi Prefecture: Toru Hirai 
Yamanashi Prefecture: Kōmei Mochizuki

Events

January to March - 1984 Heavy snowfall in Japan, according to Fire and Disaster Management Agency confirmed report, 131 person fatalities, 1,366 are injures.
January 18 - 83 are killed during an explosion at the Mitsui Miike coal mine in Ōmuta, Fukuoka.
Glico Morinaga case
Market Oriented Sector Selective talks
 June to July - A food poisoning occurs due to the fact that mustard lotus root is infected with clostridium botulinum in Kumamoto, According to official confirmed report, resulting to 11 persons lives in this case.
September 13 – Otaki earthquake
October date unknown – Japan Telecom, as predecessor of SoftBank was founded.

Popular culture

Arts and entertainment
In film, The Funeral by Juzo Itami won the Best film award at the Japan Academy Prize and at the Hochi Film Awards, MacArthur's Children by Masahiro Shinoda won Best film at the Blue Ribbon Awards and Mahjong hōrōki by Makoto Wada won Best film at the Yokohama Film Festival. For a list of Japanese films released in 1984 see Japanese films of 1984.

In manga, the winners of the Shogakukan Manga Award were Human Crossing by Masao Yajima and Kenshi Hirokane (general), Futari Daka and Area 88 by Kaoru Shintani (shōnen), Yume no Ishibumi by Toshie Kihara (shōjo) and Kinnikuman by Yudetamago (children). X+Y by Moto Hagio won the Seiun Award for Best Comic of the Year. For a list of manga released in 1984 see :Category:1984 manga.

In music, the 35th Kōhaku Uta Gassen was won by the Red Team (women). Hiroshi Itsuki won the 26th Japan Record Awards, held on December 31, and the FNS Music Festival.

In television, see: 1984 in Japanese television.

Japan hosted the Miss International 1984 beauty pageant, won by Guatemalan Ilma Urrutia.

Sports
At the 1984 Summer Olympics Japan ranked 7th with 10 gold medals. At the Winter Olympics Japan ranked 14th with one silver medal.

In football (soccer), Japan hosted the 1984 Intercontinental Cup. Yomiuri won the Japan Soccer League. For the champions of the regional leagues see: 1984 Japanese Regional Leagues.

Births

January 
January 1 – Hideki Asai, baseball player
January 30 – Yushi Aida, baseball player

February 
February 1 – Risa Wataya, novelist
February 11 – Mai Demizu, announcer
February 19 – Masaru Akiba, football player
February 21 – Karina Nose, model, actress

March 
March 3 – Akiho Yoshizawa, adult video actress
March 4 – Ai Iwamura, actress
March 6 – Becky, singer, model, actress
March 8 – Eri Yamada, softball player
March 20 – Nomura Yuka, actress

April 
April 6 – Takahiro Aoh, boxer
April 7 – Hiroko Shimabukuro, singer
April 21 – Taku Akahoshi, football player

May 
May 1 - Keiichiro Koyama, singer
May 7 – Miyuki Kanbe, model and actress (died 2008)
May 17 – Sakurako Terada, curler

June 
June 4 – Aoi, singer-songwriter
June 5 – Hiromi Matsunaga, bowling player
June 7
 Shu Abe, football player
 Eri Yanetani, snowboarder
June 12 – Kyoco, actress
June 13 – Kaori Icho, wrestler
June 13 – Ryuji Akiba, football player
June 16 – Emiri Miyasaka, model
June 23 – Takeshi Matsuda, swimmer
June 26 – Emi Tawata, singer
June 29 – Keiji Obiki, baseball player

July 
July 4 – Jin Akanishi, actor, singer-songwriter
July 8 – Nobu Naruse, cross-country skier
July 16 – Hayanari Shimoda, race car driver
July 24 – Hajime Ohara, professional wrestler
July 25
Kenji Narisako, hurdler
Akie Uegaki, handball player

August 
August 3 – Erika Araki, volleyball player
August 5 – Takamasa Anai, judoka
August 12 – Yua Aida, model and AV idol
August 19 – Ryota Aoki, football player
August 21 – Nonaka Emi, ice hockey player
August 27 – Miyuki Akiyama, volleyball player

September 
September 8 – Kenta Abe, baseball player
September 13 – Junichi Sawayashiki, kickboxer
September 22 – Yukiya Arashiro, road bicycle racer

October 
October 5 – Yutaro Abe, football player
October 7 – Toma Ikuta, actor
October 8 – Jun Ando, football player
October 9 – Ryunosuke Okamoto, football player
October 10 – Chiaki Kuriyama, actress, model
October 13 – Misono, singer-songwriter
October 22 – Takuya Asao, baseball player
October 24 – Kaela Kimura, singer, model

November 
November 3 – Ryo Nishikido, actor, singer
November 10 – Moe Meguro, curler
November 21 – Masatomo Kuba, football player
November 28 – Sayuri Yoshii, speed skater

December 
December 4 - Takayuki Kishi, professional baseball player
December 5 – Shuhei Aoyama, motorcycle racer
December 17 – Asuka Fukuda, J-pop singer
December 23 – Manabu Soya, professional wrestler

Unknown date 
T-cophony, musician

Deaths
March 16 - Kayo Yamaguchi, painter  (b. 1899)
April 5 – Keisuke Serizawa, textile designer (b. 1895)
April 6 - Kazuo Hasegawa, film actor (b. 1908)
April 9 - Masashi Amenomori, voice actor (b. 1930)
May 5 – Takayoshi Yoshioka, sprinter (b. 1909)
May 25 - Jūrō Gotō, Major-General in the Japanese Imperial Army (b. 1887)
June 15 – Michio Takeyama, writer, literary critic (b. 1903)
June 23 – Yatarō Kurokawa, actor (b. 1910)
July 25 – Akihiko Hirata, actor (b. 1927)
November 13 - Shizo Kanakuri, marathon runner (b. 1891)
November 21 - Kōsaku Takii, writer (b. 1894)

Unknown date
 Hiroyuki Tajima, printmaker (b. 1911)

See also
 1984 in Japanese television
 List of Japanese films of 1984

References

 
Japan
Years of the 20th century in Japan